Rugushuiyeh-ye Sofla (also Romanized as Rūgūshū’īyeh-ye Soflā; also known as Rogūshū’īyeh-ye Pā’īn, Rūgoshū’īyeh-ye Soflā, Rūgūshū’īyeh Pā’īn, and Rūgūshū’īyeh-ye Pā’īn) is a village in Jowzam Rural District, Dehaj District, Shahr-e Babak County, Kerman Province, Iran. At the 2006 census, its population was 43, in 15 families.

References 

Populated places in Shahr-e Babak County